The Hortonville Area School District (HASD) is a school district in the U.S. state of Wisconsin. It serves the communities of Hortonville and Greenville, and parts of Center, Dale, Ellington, Grand Chute, Hortonia, and Liberty. As of 2012, the district enrollment was 3,555. The district maintains six school buildings on three campuses. Total district population was 18,952 at the 2010 Census.

Schools

K4 Schools
HASD provides 4-year-old kindergarten at sites throughout the community. Sites include:
 Fox West YMCA
 Hillside Preschool
 Hortonville Elementary School
North Greenville Elementary School
 Play and Grow Learning Center
 St. Edward School

Elementary schools
 Greenville Elementary School
 Hortonville Elementary School
 North Greenville Elementary School

Middle schools
 Greenville Middle School
 Hortonville Middle School
 Fox West Academy (Grades 6-8) (charter school)

High school
Hortonville High School

History
During the 1972-1974 school years, teachers belonging to the Hortonville Education Association went on strike against the Hortonville School District. Strikes by teachers were illegal under state law. The 84 striking teachers were replaced by strikebreakers and classes resumed. The union took the firings by the school board to court, asserting that the disciplinary hearings held by the Hortonville Board of Education were prejudiced because of the board's role as the bargaining unit for the district.

The case went to the Wisconsin Supreme Court, which found for the Hortonville Education Association, reversing Wisconsin lower courts, which had found for the school board.

The case went to the United States Supreme Court. In a 6–3 decision authored by Chief Justice Warren E. Burger, the court found the board had held the power to discipline the teachers under state law, and further that the action was in the best interests of the community, in providing continued education for the charges of the board, the students.

Notes

References

External links
Hortonville Area School District website

Education in Outagamie County, Wisconsin
School districts in Wisconsin